Charles P. Finch (born 15 August 1962) is a British businessman and film producer. Finch is the CEO of the brand development and investment company Finch + Partners, and former global chairman of Dean & DeLuca.

Early life and family 
Born Charles Peter George Thomas Ingle Finch, Finch is the son of the actor Peter Finch and grandson of the chemist and mountaineer George Finch. Finch was raised in Jamaica and France and schooled at Gordonstoun, in Scotland. His mother was the British-born South African actress and writer Yolande Turner.

Career

Film 
Finch wrote and directed the 1988 fantasy film Priceless Beauty, and the 1991 thriller Where Sleeping Dogs Lie. He wrote, directed and acted in the 1998 film Never Ever.  Films Finch has produced include Bad Girls (1994), which starred Andie MacDowell and Drew Barrymore and was co-written by his mother Yolande Turner; and Spider (2002), which starred Ralph Fiennes and was directed by David Cronenberg.

In 2008 Finch was executive producer on Battle for Haditha, a dramatisation of the Haditha massacre of 2005, in which 24 unarmed Iraqi men, women and children were killed by United States Marines. The film was directed by Nick Broomfield and aired on Channel 4. It was awarded the Grierson Award for Best Drama Documentary.  In 2014, Finch was executive producer on Broomfield's Tales of the Grim Sleeper, which was shortlisted for the Academy Award for Best Documentary Feature. He was also executive producer on Broomfield's 2017 documentary Whitney: Can I Be Me.  Finch was also executive producer on the 2017 documentary Love, Cecil, a portrait of the photographer Cecil Beaton, directed by Lisa Immordino Vreeland.

Business 
After a 10-year career of writing, directing and producing films, Finch joined the William Morris Agency in 1997 as Head of International Operations. He was responsible for working with artists including Kevin Spacey, John Malkovich, Willem Dafoe, Cate Blanchett and Kristin Scott-Thomas, as well as corporate clients including Granada, BBC, Carlton, Pearson, and Channel 4.

In 2005, Finch founded Finch + Partners, a London and Paris-based media company. In 2014, offices of Finch + Partners were opened in Bangkok and Hong Kong. Alongside developing and financing brands that the company owns, Finch + Partners also advises other global brands, entertainment companies, celebrated individuals and philanthropic organisations on brand development, product endorsement, events and marketing. Clients include DIOR, Chanel, Armani, Pernod Ricard, LVMH, PACE, Jaeger-Le Coultre, Cartier, Gucci, and Mulberry, as well as consumer brands such as Kleenex, Aviva, BT and BA.

In 2011, Finch started a leisure and swimwear brand, Chucs Dive & Mountain Shop. Chucs Bar and Grill opened in August 2014 on Dover Street. In 2014, Finch sold a majority stake in Chucs to Oakley Capital. He remains a shareholder and on the board of directors of the subsidiary.

In the spring of 2015, Finch became a shareholder and vice-chairman of the upscale grocery retailers Dean & DeLuca. Subsequently, in 2016, he became worldwide chairman, with the aim of further developing and expanding the brand globally. Finch resigned from the board in February 2019.

Finch has interests in a number of companies. He is on the board of Assouline, a luxury book publisher, and of the fashion house Giles Deacon. He is also a shareholder and on the board of the film-streaming platform Mubi.

Publishing 
In 2009, Finch started Finch's Quarterly Review with Nicholas Foulkes and Tristram Fetherstonhaugh. The quarterly ceased publication in 2012.

In 2016, Finch released the book The Night Before BAFTA in 2016. This coffee table book focused on his annual pre-BAFTA party, and was published by Assouline.

Finch established the Finch Publishing group in 2018. Finch Publishing launched the film & culture magazine A Rabbit's Foot in May 2022.

Finch has been a contributing columnist for GQ, the Financial Times and Esquire. He has been included in Vanity Fairs International Best-Dressed List three times.

Filmography

Producer 

 1991 Where Sleeping Dogs Lie (co-producer)
 1994 Bad Girls (producer)
 1995 The Maddening (executive producer)
 2001 Mike Bassett: England Manager (executive producer)
 2002 Spider (executive producer)
 2004 Fat Slags (producer)
 2006 The Interrogation of Leo and Lisa (short) (executive producer)
 2006 His Big White Shelf (television documentary) (executive producer)
 2006 Ghosts (executive producer)
 2007 Battle for Haditha (executive producer)
 2007 Ruby Blue (executive producer)
 2008 Camille (executive producer)
 2013 The Smile Man (short) (executive producer)
 2014 The Gift (short) (executive producer)
 2014 Jump! (short) (executive producer)
 2014 Tales of the Grim Sleeper (documentary) (executive producer)
 2016 Going Going Gone: Nick Broomfield's Disappearing Britain (documentary television series) (executive producer – two episodes)
 2017 Whitney: Can I Be Me (documentary) (executive producer)
 2017 Love, Cecil (documentary) (executive producer)
2019 Marianne & Leonard - Nick Broomfield Documentary (executive producer)

Writer 

 1988 Priceless Beauty
 1991 Where Sleeping Dogs Lie
 1994 Bad Girls (story)
 1996 The Dentist
 1996 Never Ever
 1998 The Dentist 2

Actor 

 1986 Amazons (Timar)
 1991 Where Sleeping Dogs Lie (Evan Best)
 1995 French Exit (TV show host)
 1996 Never Ever (Thomas Murray)

Appearance as self 

 2014 Annabel's: A String of Naked Lightbulbs (documentary)

Director 

 1988 Priceless Beauty
 1991 Where Sleeping Dogs Lie
 1996 Never Ever

References 

1962 births
Living people
People educated at Gordonstoun
British chief executives
British film producers
British male screenwriters